The Collyer Downtown Historic District is a  historic district in Collyer, Kansas, USA. It was listed on the National Register of Historic Places in 2010. The listing included 10 contributing buildings and two contributing structures.

The district includes two historic water towers and a city hall.

References

External links

Historic districts on the National Register of Historic Places in Kansas
National Register of Historic Places in Trego County, Kansas
Early Commercial architecture in the United States
Buildings and structures completed in 1926